The 2012 6 Hours of Bahrain was an auto race held at Bahrain International Circuit, Sakhir, Bahrain on Saturday 29 September 2012.  It was the inaugural running of the 6 Hours of Bahrain and the sixth round of the 2012 FIA World Endurance Championship season.

The race was dominated by Audi Sport Team Joest who swept to a 1-2 victory with Benoît Tréluyer, Marcel Fässler and André Lotterer taking a one lap win over the Audi R18 e-tron quattro of Allan McNish and Tom Kristensen. Nicolas Lapierre for Toyota lead early in the race only to pit with faulty number plate illumination, losing over ten minutes in the pits before ultimately retired after a collision.  The Strakka Racing HPD claimed third, six laps behind the winners.

The LMP2 category was won by the Pecom Racing Oreca 03 driven by Pierre Kaffer, Nicolas Minassian and Luís Pérez Companc, who held a two lap gap over the bulk of the class Signatech's of Jordan Tresson, Olivier Lombard and Franck Mailleux finished in second place.  The AF Corse Ferrari pair of Toni Vilander and Giancarlo Fisichella won LMGTE Pro by a lap over Aston Martin Racing, which allowed AF Corse to wrap up the class championship.  AF Corse's Olivier Beretta, driving another Ferrari, was excluded from the event after making avoidable contact with Greaves Motorsports' Ricardo González.  Porsche won LMGTE Am class with the Team Felbermayr-Proton 997 of Christian Ried, Gianluca Roda and Paolo Ruberti leading by a lap over the Waltrip Ferrari.

Qualifying

Qualifying result
Pole position winners in each class are marked in bold.

Race

Race result
Class winners in bold. Cars failing to complete 70% of winner's distance marked as Not Classified (NC).

  Olivier Beretta was excluded from the race by the stewards for making avoidable contact.  The No. 71 Ferrari's result was not affected.

References

8 Hours of Bahrain
Bahrain
6 Hours